William Martin Scott (27 March 1870 – 26 February 1944) was an English international rugby union half back who played club rugby for Cambridge University and Northern. Scott played international rugby for England and was an original member of invitational team, the Barbarians. He also played first-class cricket for Cambridge University.

Personal history
Scott was born in 1870 in Gateshead, the sixth son of Sir Walter Scott, 1st Baronet of Beauclerc, and Ann Brough. Scott was educated at Craigmount School in Edinburgh, and matriculated at Jesus College, Cambridge, in 1888. He married Janie Campbell on 19 May 1906. He died on 26 February 1944 at Horsham in Sussex.

Rugby career
Scott followed his elder brother Mason in becoming a member of the Cambridge University team whilst at Jesus College. He won his only sporting 'blue' in the 1888 Varsity Match one year after his brother represented Cambridge for the final time. In the Varsity Match, Scott was partnered at halfback by William Wotherspoon and they made a formidable pair. Within the first five minutes, Scott and Wotherspoon combined well to set up an early try for Frederick Alderson. Alderson repaid Scott later in the match by making ground before passing to Scott to score a try himself. Scott then took the conversion attempt and successfully turned his try into a goal. Cambridge held on to their lead, with Scott's play during the game being described as 'brilliant'. He also played six first-class cricket matches for the university.

Scott's one and only international cap came in 1889 when he was selected for the England team to face the New Zealand Natives. Still classed as a Cambridge player, Scott was paired at halfback with Fred Bonsor in an ill-tempered game. Although England won the match, Scott never represented his country again.

In 1890, now a player for Northern Football Club, Scott and his brother Mason were approached by William Percy Carpmael to join his newly formed touring team the Barbarians. In accepting both men became founding members of the club.

Bibliography

References

External links
Cricinfo: William Scott
Biography of Arthur Budd with an England team photograph including William Martin Scott

1870 births
1944 deaths
Alumni of Jesus College, Cambridge
Barbarian F.C. players
Blackheath F.C. players
Cambridge University cricketers
Cambridge University R.U.F.C. players
England international rugby union players
English cricketers
English rugby union players
People educated at Craigmount School
Rugby union players from Gateshead
Younger sons of baronets